Zalči is a small settlement along the road from Ilirska Bistrica to Podgrad in the Inner Carniola region of Slovenia.

History
Zalči became an independent settlement in 2006, when territory was split off from the settlements of Podbeže, Tominje, Harije, and Sabonje to constitute it.

References

External links
Zalči on Geopedia

Populated places in the Municipality of Ilirska Bistrica